The list of presidents of the United States by net worth at peak varies greatly. Debt and depreciation often means that presidents' net worth is less than $0 at the time of death. Most presidents before 1845 were extremely wealthy, especially Andrew Jackson and George Washington. 	 
	
Presidents since 1929, when Herbert Hoover took office, have generally been wealthier than presidents of the late nineteenth and early twentieth centuries; with the exception of Harry S. Truman, all presidents since this time have been millionaires. These presidents have often received income from autobiographies and other writing. Except for Franklin D. Roosevelt and John F. Kennedy (both of whom died while in office), all presidents beginning with Calvin Coolidge have written autobiographies. In addition, many presidents—including Bill Clinton—have earned considerable income from public speaking after leaving office.

The richest president in history is purported to be Donald Trump. His net worth, however, is not precisely known because the Trump Organization is privately held. 

Truman was among the poorest U.S. presidents, with a net worth considerably less than $1 million. His financial situation contributed to the doubling of the presidential salary to $100,000 in 1949. In addition, the presidential pension was created in 1958 when Truman was again experiencing financial difficulties. Harry and Bess Truman received the first Medicare Cards in 1966 via the Social Security Act of 1965.

List of presidents by peak net worth

The figures in the table below are all derived from 24/7 Wall St.'s 2016 valuation of each president's peak net worth. For purposes of 24/7 Wall St.'s valuation, a president's peak net worth may occur after that president has left office. To allow for a direct comparison, all of the figures have been adjusted for inflation to 2022 U.S. dollars.

See also
List of richest American politicians

Notes

References

Net worth

United States Presidents
Economy of the United States-related lists